Pareiorhina cepta is a species of catfish in the family Loricariidae. It is native to South America, where it occurs in the São Francisco River basin in the state of Minas Gerais in Brazil. It is known to occur alongside the species Astyanax rivularis, Characidium fasciatum, Neoplecostomus franciscoensis, and Trichomycterus macrotrichopterus. The species reaches 4.4 cm (1.7 inches) in standard length.

The streams in which Pareiorhina cepta occurs are characterized by an elevation of 810 to 1065 m (2657 to 3494 ft) above sea level, a width of 3 to 5 m (10 to 16 ft), a depth of 25 to 150 cm (9.8 to 59.1 inches), a temperature of 16.6 to 19.5 °C (61.9 to 67.1 °F), a highly acidic pH of 2.78 to 2.87, a conductivity of 0.013 to 0.014 µS/cm, an oxygen concentration of 5.91 to 13.05 mg/L, clear water, moderate to fast flow, marginal vegetation, and a substrate composed of rocks, gravel, and sand.

References 

Loricariidae
Fish described in 2012
Catfish of South America
Freshwater fish of Brazil